Ni'ihau High & Elementary School or Niihau Island School is a public K-12 school in Niihau, Hawaii, United States. It is operated by the Hawaii Department of Education.

In 2007 the school had on average about 30 students, though it is common for them to go back and forth between Niihau and Kauai, so not every student will be present each day.

Prior to 2007 generators powered the facility. As power was not constant, it meant that using computers had difficulty and that students mostly ate canned food instead of fresh food. In 2007 a 72-battery, 80 solar panel photovoltaic solar power system was introduced. It had a cost of $207,000. A rock wall windbreak prevented wind from interfering. The power count was 10.4 kW. It was the first school in Hawaii relying on this system.

References

External links
 Profile - Hawaii Department of Education

Public K-12 schools in Hawaii
Public schools in Kauai County, Hawaii
Public high schools in Kauai County, Hawaii
Niihau